Graham Miles (11 May 1941 – 12 October 2014) was an English snooker player.

Career
Miles turned professional in 1971. He first gained recognition in 1974, when he reached the final of the World Championship. Although he lost 12–22 to Ray Reardon, this turned out to be the highlight of his career.

Despite his modest success in major tournaments, Miles became one of the best known players in Britain, in an era when there was little televised snooker other than the Pot Black series, because he won the event in consecutive years, in 1974 (after entering as a late replacement for Fred Davis, who withdrew because of illness) and again in 1975. Other notable moments in Miles's career included reaching the final of the 1976 Masters, where he again lost to Reardon.

The 1978/79 season saw something of a purple patch for Miles. At the 1978 UK Championship he defeated Rex Williams 9–8 and then hammered Willie Thorne 9–1, which included what was then a championship record break of 139 in the last frame. However, he was then dispatched 1–9 by eventual winner Doug Mountjoy.

This form continued in January 1979, when he reached the final of the Holsten Lager International by defeating John Pulman, Dennis Taylor and Alex Higgins. He led John Spencer 7–6 in the final, having made a break of 107, but eventually lost 7–11 to take £2000 as runner-up.

Miles led defending champion Ray Reardon 3–0 and 5–3 in the first round of the 1979 World Championship, but he came down with flu and lost 8–13. Straight after this, Miles defeated Doug Mountjoy 4–3 and Perrie Mans 5–2 in the group stages of the Pontins Professional Event. Miles then beat Steve Davis 4–0 in the semi-final, but lost 4–8 in the final to Doug Mountjoy.

At the inaugural World Team Cup, Miles represented England along with John Spencer and Fred Davis, where they reached the final only to be beaten 3–14 by Wales. His last major title was the 1981 Tolly Cobbold Classic, when he beat Cliff Thorburn 5–1 in Ipswich. During the 1980s he slid down the rankings, and 1984 saw his last appearance at the World Championship.
 
Following a period of poor form Miles developed an idiosyncratic sighting style when using his cue as he was left-eye dominant and had a large chin. This style became more pronounced over time, to the point where the cue ran beneath his left ear.

Personal life
After retiring from the game in 1992, he ran two snooker clubs at Sandwell, West Midlands, and one in Crewe, Cheshire. He came out of retirement to play at the Seniors Pot Black competition in 1997.

Miles died on 12 October 2014, aged 73.

Performance and rankings timeline

Career finals

Ranking finals: 1

Non-ranking finals: 8 (3 titles)

Pro-am finals: 1 (1 title)

Team finals: 2

References

1941 births
2014 deaths
English snooker players
Sportspeople from Birmingham, West Midlands